Football Manager is the first game in the Football Manager series.

Development and release
Kevin Toms developed the first game, which was text-only, on a Video Genie, a clone of the Tandy TRS-80. The title evolved out of a board game Toms first designed aged 11 that was itself inspired by the 1968 football management simulation board game Soccerama. Early iterations were modelled on the cardboard from cereal packets and blank card decks, but Toms was inspired to develop it into a computer game after purchasing a ZX81 and deciding this was a "much better tool to run the game on, especially for automating things like the league table calculations and fixtures".

It was later converted to the Sinclair ZX80 and ZX81, and Toms created the software label Addictive Games to launch the game in 1982. It was then ported to the ZX Spectrum with added animated graphics showing match highlights.

The game was a huge success and was ported to a wide range of systems between 1984 and 1987. While the Amiga, Amstrad CPC, Atari ST, BBC Micro, Commodore 64, MSX and DOS versions, kept or improved all features such as the match highlights graphics, all others (including the Acorn Electron, Atari 8-bit Commodore 16 and Plus/4 were, like the original, text only.

Gameplay
The game was written entirely in BASIC and, apart from the match highlights on some versions, used only text displays and keyboard entry. The player chooses a team and then must try to earn promotion from the fourth to the first division (although the player can then keep playing for as many seasons as they wish). The player also competes in the FA Cup. Though the team and player names are real, they are not accurately represented, so whichever team is selected, the player always starts in the fourth division and their team is randomly populated with players. Each player has a skill rating and an energy rating. Players must be rested to renew their energy rating or they become injured. The players' skill and energy ratings also change at the end of the season. The team has ratings of defence, midfield and attack (the total skills of all defenders, midfielders or attackers selected), energy (an average of all selected players) and morale (which increases when the team wins and decreases when they lose). The player can select their team to balance the skills based on the opposing team's ratings (e.g. to increase the defence rating if the opposition has a high attack rating).

As the match is played, the screen is updated if a goal is scored. For versions with animated graphics highlights, attempts on goal are shown in isometric 3D at either end of the pitch with a scoreboard showing the current score. The player cannot affect the game while it is in progress.

The player must also balance finances. Weekly income and expenditure is calculated and bank loans can be taken out. There is also a basic player transfer system. Random players become available to buy which the player can bid for. If the squad reaches the maximum of 16, no players will be available to buy. The player can also list their own players for sale and then accept or reject bids.

Game progress can be saved at any time. A customiser utility was included with the game so players could rename the teams and players.

Reception
Football Manager was a commercial hit, selling 500,000 copies in its first six years available.

The game was well received by the gaming press although Sinclair User did comment on the lack of realism of the teams and individual player ratings. The excitement of watching the game in progress was often seen as the highlight of the game. Electron User claimed the game was "one of the best strategy games available for home computers" with reviewer Dave Carlos stating "I doubt that this game will ever be bettered".

The game was nominated in the 1983 Golden Joystick Awards for best strategy game, eventually coming second to the Melbourne House adventure game The Hobbit. In 1985, Tony Hetherington of Computer Gamer magazine included the game in "The Spectrum Collection" - "15 classic games that all Spectrum owners should have".

By 1991, when reviewing the £2.99 budget release, Amiga Power awarded a score of only 19% as the game had been "out-featured by practically every other game in the genre" but was "still massively addictive" and referred to as a "classic" and "one of the legends of computer gaming". The ZX Spectrum version was voted the 26th best game of all time in a special issue of Your Sinclair magazine in 2004.

Steve Mann for Personal Computer World said "I can vouch for the satisfaction that can be gained from this program. Recommended."

Bob Wade for Personal Computer Games said "It is one of the most addictive games I have ever played and if you will excuse me I'm just off to take Wimbledon to the Cup Final."

Legacy

In August 2015, Toms began rewriting the original 1982 Football Manager game for mobile devices after pitching the idea to his followers, drawing on his work experience of business app development. The new game, Football Star* Manager (KTFSM), was released in 2016 to an overwhelmingly positive response from buyers – many of them former players of the original Football Manager series. KTFSM was first released on iOS and Android; since its release, the game has been ported to macOS, Windows 10 and Amazon Fire. The game is as near to the original Football Manager as you can get on the new platforms.

In January 2022, Kevin launched a Kickstarter to fund a new version of his Football Manager game, Football New Manager, to mark the 40th anniversary of the original game.

Reviews
The ZX Spectrum Book
ACE (Advanced Computer Entertainment) - Nov, 1989
ASM (Aktueller Software Markt) - Feb, 1986
Atari ST User - Jun, 1988
ASM (Aktueller Software Markt) - Dec, 1986
Amiga Power - Jul, 1991

References

1982 video games
Addictive Games games
Amiga games
Amstrad CPC games
Association football video games
Atari 8-bit family games
Atari ST games
BBC Micro and Acorn Electron games
Commodore 16 and Plus/4 games
Commodore 64 games
DOS games
Dragon 32 games
 
MSX games
Oric games
Single-player video games
TRS-80 games
VIC-20 games
Video games developed in the United Kingdom
ZX Spectrum games
ZX81 games